The Women's under-23 road race at the 2014 European Road Championships took place in Nyon, Switzerland on 12 July over a course of 129.6 km.

Race
The breakaway of three riders, with Sabrina Stultiens, Elena Cecchini and Annabelle Dreville,  were not caught by the bunch and sprinted for the European title. Dutchwomen Stultiens was the fastest of the three and won the second gold medal for the Netherlands at the 2014 European Road Championships ahead of Checchini and Dreville. Thalita de Jong from the Netherlands won the sprint of the peloton behind them.

Top 10 final classification

Source

References

See also

 2014 European Road Championships – Women's under-23 time trial

2014 European Road Championships
European Road Championships – Women's U23 road race
2014 in women's road cycling